South Carolina Highway 914 (SC 914) is a  state highway in the U.S. state of South Carolina. The highway connects Lancaster and Springdale, via Lancaster Mill.

Route description
SC 914 begins at an intersection with SC 9 Business (SC 9 Bus.; West Meeting Street) on the Lancaster–Lancaster Mill line, within Lancaster County. It travels to the southeast and immediately enters Lancaster Mill proper and curves to the south-southeast. Just after Old Landsford Road, it crosses over some railroad tracks. One block later, at Mahaffey Line Drive, SC 914 travels along the Lancaster Mill–Springdale line for a few blocks. On the northwest corner of Lancaster Memorial Park cemetery, it enters Springdale proper. It curves to the southeast and intersects the eastern terminus of Grace Avenue. SC 914 turns left onto the roadway, now known as Airport Road. Two blocks later, it meets its eastern terminus, an intersection with SC 200 (Great Falls Highway). Here, Airport Road continues to the southeast.

Major intersections

See also

References

External links

SC 914 at Virginia Highways' South Carolina Highways Annex

914
Transportation in Lancaster County, South Carolina